Wellers Bay is a small bay on Lake Ontario, on the west side of Prince Edward County. In 1861 the Government of the Province of Canada considered making it a "harbour of refuge", and installing a lighthouse.

During World War II the beach was part of the Consecon Air Weapons Range and was used as a firing range, for pilot-trainees.

In 1978 the Weller's Bay National Wildlife Area was created.  Subsequently, locals used to using the area for fishing, snowmobiling, and other recreational uses started clashing with officials charged with a responsibility to protect wildlife.  In the 1990s officials started issuing fines.  Municipal politicians tried negotiating a relaxation of the rules, without success.  On May 27, 2011, the Canadian Wildlife Service announced the bay's beaches would be off limits.

A key  of the  bay are set aside as a National Wildlife Area, including Bald Island, Bald Head Island, Fox Island, and the sandspit that protects the bay, because the sandspit that protected the bay was one of the last undeveloped spits on the great lakes, and it was an important bird habitat.  No one is allowed on this portion of the bay, without a permit.

References

Bays of Lake Ontario